Castlemaine Harbour is a Ramsar site, Special Area of Conservation, Special Protection Area and national nature reserve of approximately  located in County Kerry, Ireland.

Features
Castlemaine Harbour was legally protected as a national nature reserve by the Irish government in 1990. The area is also listed as a Special Area of Conservation and a Special Protection Area. In 1990, the site was also declared Ramsar site number 470.

The Harbour is at the head of Dingle Bay, and is the estuary of two rivers. The reserve includes salt marshes, sandbanks, and mudflats which are protected from the sea by a large system of dunes. One of the four largest Zostera beds in Ireland is found in the Harbour's mudflats, and these provide food for a wide variety of water birds which overwinter there, including the light-bellied Brent goose, Branta bernicla hrota. Among the birds recorded on the site are sanderlings, oystercatchers, red-throated divers, and greenshanks. The natterjack toad, an endangered species in Ireland, is also found in the reserve.

References

Geography of County Kerry
Nature reserves in the Republic of Ireland
Tourist attractions in County Kerry
Protected areas established in 1990
1990 establishments in Ireland
Ramsar sites in the Republic of Ireland
Special Areas of Conservation in the Republic of Ireland
Special Protection Areas in the Republic of Ireland